St. Marxmen is a mixtape by M.O.P. It is a mixture of new songs, unreleased songs from the Roc-A-Fella era and some cameos such as Ol' Dirty Bastard's "Pop Shots" (Remix). The track "Big Boy Game" was recorded when M.O.P. signed to G-Unit Records.

Track listing 
 "Flip Intro" – 1:07
 "Pain" – 3:56
 "Big Boy Game"  – 2:44
 "It's Hard to Tell" (featuring Foxx and Inf) – 3:29
 "Suicide" (featuring Teflon) – 3:26
 "Hip Hop Cops" (featuring Wyclef Jean) – 4:59
 "Pop Shots" (remix) (featuring ODB) – 3:42
 "Classical Skit" – 0:15
 "Put It in the Air" (featuring Jay-Z) – 4:03
 "Skit" – 0:09
 "Muddy Waters" – 4:16
 "Party Like a Rock Star" – 3:59
 "Instigator" – 5:21
 "Take a Minute" – 3:00
 "G Boy Stance" – 4:15
 "The Wedding" (Skit) – 4:32
 "Second Thoughts" [bonus track] – 4:11

Charts

References

2005 albums
M.O.P. albums
Albums produced by DJ Premier
Albums produced by 9th Wonder
Albums produced by Nottz
E1 Music albums